Judy Klitsner (born 1957) is a contemporary Bible scholar, author and international speaker.  She is a senior faculty member of the Pardes Institute for Jewish Studies in Jerusalem,  where she has taught Bible and biblical exegesis for more than twenty years. 

A disciple of the famous Torah teacher Nechama Leibowitz, Klitsner has grown to world acclaim through her writing and teaching of biblical commentary, which weaves together traditional exegesis, modern scholarship, and her own original interpretations that are informed by close readings of the text.

Klitsner lectures widely at synagogues and academic institutions. Venues have included Harvard University, Brown University, the Graduate Theological Union at UC Berkeley, Yeshivat Chovevei Torah, Hebrew College, the Jewish Theological Seminary of America, the University of Judaism,  Drisha, Mechon Hadar, Limmud, JOFA, the 92nd Street Y, and the Skirball Center.

Klitsner is the author of many  articles  and of the book, Subversive Sequels in the Bible: How Biblical Stories Mine and Undermine Each Other  published in hardcover by the Jewish Publication Society  in October 2009 and in softcover by Koren Publishers Jerusalem in January 2011.

Awards
Subversive Sequels in the Bible received a 2009 National Jewish Book Award in the Scholarship category.

Selected works
 Subversive sequels in the Bible : how biblical stories mine and undermine each other , 2008
 Inside-outside : Biblical leaders and their non-Jewish mentors, 2017

Reference

External links
 
 www.korenpub.com
Subversive Sequels in the Bible: How Biblical Stories Mine and Undermine Each Other on Amazon
Subversive Sequels in the Bible: How Biblical Stories Mine and Undermine Each Other on Pardes' faculty bookstore 

1957 births
Living people
Jewish biblical scholars
Female biblical scholars
20th-century Jewish biblical scholars
21st-century Jewish biblical scholars